State Route 551 (SR 551) is an east-west state highway in southern Ohio. Existing entirely within Pike County's Pee Pee Township, SR 551 follows the south shore of Lake White, while SR 552 follows the north shore. Lake White State Park is located near SR 551's western terminus.

Route description
SR 551 commences at a T-intersection with SR 220 near the west shore of Lake White southwest of the village of Waverly. Abutted by forest on the south side for most of its length, SR 551 starts out in a southerly direction, then hooks around the west end of Lake White, bending to the northeast.  Generally following in parallel with the south shore of Lake White, the state highway passes a number of cottages and side streets that connect to additional cottages.  The highway then travels in an inverted "U", curving east and then to the south and southeast. SR 551 turns east just prior to the park lands of Lake White State Park and its endpoint at a T-intersection with SR 104.

No part of SR 551 is included within the National Highway System.

History
Originally designated in 1937 along the route that it currently occupies along the south shore of Lake White, SR 551 has not seen any significant changes to its routing since its creation.

Major intersections

References

551
Transportation in Pike County, Ohio